Vermin Love Supreme (born 1960 or 1961) is an American performance artist and activist who has run as a candidate in various local, state, and national elections in the United States. He served as a member of the Libertarian Party's judicial committee. Supreme is known for wearing a boot as a hat and carrying a large toothbrush, and has said that if elected President of the United States, he will pass a law requiring people to brush their teeth. He has campaigned on a platform of zombie apocalypse awareness and time travel research, and promised a free pony for every American.

In 2011, he participated in the Occupy Boston protests.
He is the subject of the 2014 documentary Who Is Vermin Supreme? An Outsider Odyssey, which follows his 2012 campaign and explores his life as an activist and political prankster.

Supreme campaigned for the Libertarian Party's 2020 presidential nomination. At the 2020 Libertarian National Convention he came in third place, receiving 206 delegate votes.

Political positions

Supreme generally runs for office as a satirical candidate, making proposals that are considered outlandish or unrealistic and communicating in an unorthodox way in order to mock politicians and the political system. His eccentric attire includes multiple ties and a boot on his head, and he sometimes carries a giant toothbrush. He has created attention by giving interviews to reporters and crashing campaign events for major candidates. Some of the main themes of Vermin Supreme's campaigns are instituting a mandatory tooth brushing law, giving every American a free pony, using zombies for renewable energy, zombie apocalypse awareness, and time travel research. He largely avoided discussing major political issues until his 2020 presidential campaign, which was more serious. Supreme has run variously as a Republican, a Democrat, and a Libertarian.

Supreme discussed his political views in a 2008 promotional video. He said he was registered as a Republican at that time, but that he leaned toward anarchism and was influenced by the Situationist International, dadaism and discordianism. He asserted that libertarians "are just about abolishing the government and letting shit fall where it may", which he called a mistake, though he later said that assertion was based on a "prejudice" for "lack of knowing." He asserted that Republicans want to nullify the government, but "offer no alternative to helping people other than charity." Supreme's vision of anarchism holds no need for government, but depends on citizens to take responsibility for themselves and for others, citing "mutual aid and support and care to our fellow citizens" as key elements. To that end, Supreme called for a gradual dismantling of the government, while citizens take up the slack. He asserted that Americans no longer know how to be citizens, placing some of the blame on schools that teach in a "very twisted and jingoistic fashion".

In the video, Supreme discussed his presidential campaign. He describes his "joke humor" campaign as a response to the lies people are fed by the media and by the government.

In an interview with the New Hampshire in 2018, Supreme labelled his political beliefs as "social anarchist" and opined that Peter Kropotkin "was a great anarchist thinker and writer".

Political campaigns

Early political activity

In 1986, Supreme joined the Great Peace March for Global Nuclear Disarmament in protest of nuclear weapons.  Supreme's first political campaign was for Mayor of Baltimore in 1987. At the time, Supreme was without income, and later said that he ran "mainly to give myself a project...something to do." The election was won by Kurt Schmoke.

Presidential campaigns

Supreme has run in every presidential election since 1992.

2004

Supreme campaigned in the Washington, D.C. presidential primary in 2004, where he received 149 votes.

2008

Supreme campaigned in the New Hampshire Republican primary in 2008. He received 41 votes (0.02%) in the New Hampshire primary. According to the Federal Election Commission (FEC), he also received 43 votes nationally in the general election.

2012

Supreme campaigned as a Democrat in the 2012 U.S. presidential election. His candidacy was supported by the Good Humor Party.

On April 14, 2011, Supreme participated in the First Debate of the New Election Cycle at the IGLO Dissidents' Convention which also included Jimmy McMillan, Jill Stein and others. He qualified to be listed on the 2012 Democratic Party primary ballot in New Hampshire. On October 29, 2011, Supreme participated in a satirical debate against a representative of the campaign of deceased British occultist Aleister Crowley. On December 19, he participated in the "Lesser-Known Democratic Candidates Presidential Forum", at the New Hampshire Institute of Politics at Saint Anselm College and "glitterbombed" fellow candidate Randall Terry.

He received Iowa Democratic caucuses and received 1.4% of the votes on January 3, 2012. On January 10, 2012, in the Democratic Primary in New Hampshire, Supreme received 833 votes. (Barack Obama won the primary with 49,080 votes.)

Supreme participated in the Anti-NATO protests at the May 20–21 Chicago NATO Summit. In May 2012, he visited the second largest regional high school in Maine to give a speech about his campaign style to a government class. In June 2012, he participated in the Rainbow Gathering in Tennessee.

On August 25, Supreme announced his new political party, the Free Pony Party, and that he has chosen fellow fringe opponent Jimmy McMillan as his running mate. Conversely, McMillan stated he was still running for president on his own Rent Is Too Damn High Party platform, and that Supreme would be McMillan's running mate. In October, Supreme participated in a debate hosted by Peter Schiff in the Peter Schiff Radio Show, which featured a panel of overlooked presidential candidates including McMillan, Santa Claus, independent write-in candidate, and Edgar Lawson, write-in Republican presidential candidate.

2016

Supreme attempted another presidential run in 2016. He embarked on a tour of 20 cities to build support for his campaign and sought to qualify for matching funds from the Federal Election Commission (FEC). He filed as a candidate in the New Hampshire Democratic presidential primary on November 21, 2015. He was not invited to return to the Lesser-Known Democratic Candidates Presidential Forum, due in part to him glitterbombing Randall Terry at the event in 2011. Shortly before the primary, he was observed questioning Republican candidates Chris Christie and Ted Cruz through a bullhorn. Supreme engaged Christie in an informal debate over his free pony platform, during which he accused Christie of hating ponies, and asked Ted Cruz whether he thought that water being used during waterboarding should include fluoride.

Supreme received 256 votes in the primary on February 9, 2016, coming in fourth after former Maryland Governor Martin O'Malley, who had dropped out after the Iowa caucuses.

On March 4, Supreme switched his affiliation to the Libertarian Party. He received the vote of a single delegate in the first round of presidential nomination voting at the 2016 Libertarian National Convention.

2020

Supreme ran again for president in 2020 as a Libertarian. This marked the first time that Supreme ran a "legitimate" campaign, focusing on real rather than satirical issues and using the slogan "In On The Joke". While Supreme continued to use satirical humor, he focused more on legitimate political issues. He called for ending foreign wars and voiced support for pardoning non-violent drug offenders, ending the war on drugs, and reducing incarceration, which he called his top priority. On the COVID-19 pandemic, Supreme criticized President Donald Trump, arguing that he should have paid better attention to the virus and have made testing more widely available. He also promised to make COVID-19 illegal and, in a play on his campaign promise to go back in time and "kill baby Hitler," vowed to go back in time and "kill baby COVID." He pledged to create "COVID-19 free zones" because "they work so well for things like guns and drugs."

He won the Libertarian Presidential Preference Primary in New Hampshire on February 11, 2020. On March 3, 2020, Supreme was declared the winner of the Massachusetts primary. He dropped out on May 23, 2020, after Jo Jorgensen received the Libertarian Party's nomination for president. Incidentally, Supreme's running mate Spike Cohen was chosen to be the Libertarian vice presidential nominee.

Other campaigns

Supreme expressed interest in running for Governor of Kansas in 2018. He did not live in the state, but Kansas had very few requirements for running for office. Several teenagers taking advantage of the lack of requirements had filed to run for governor, and in order not to take any votes away from them, Supreme decided to run for Attorney General instead, becoming a challenger to incumbent Republican Derek Schmidt. The lack of requirements in order to run for office, as outlined in the state's Constitution, has been heralded by Supreme: "This is indeed a very interesting and attractive loophole," he said. "I think that’s a very good thing for democracy." Desarae Lindsay of Texas was named his campaign treasurer and would accompany him to his 2020 presidential campaign. Supreme was eventually disqualified from running on the basis of his non-residency in the state, his home address being in Massachusetts.

On August 24, 2020, Supreme announced that he would be launching a write-in campaign for the Libertarian nomination for the 2020 Massachusetts senatorial election.

"Right to pony" during 2017 Clinton book tour

In December 2017 Hillary Clinton planned to visit Concord, New Hampshire, for a book tour promoting her new book What Happened. In advance of her presentation, Supreme planned a demonstration in front of the bookstore during the event. The demonstration was to be a "pony protest" and include at least one pony. Supreme has a history of making the election promise of ponies to constituents and has asserted that Clinton does not like ponies enough. When Supreme sought a protest permit for his demonstration the police ordered the city to deny his request.

In response, Supreme asserted his "right to pony" and retained Marc Randazza, an attorney with a reputation for advocacy of First Amendment rights, to represent him in suing the city of Concord for the permit. The court found in favor of Supreme, issuing an injunction that the city give him a permit, allow him to protest the event, and allow him to bring ponies. A stipulation was that Supreme had to pay for parking for ponies at the rate for cars.

When Supreme presented the pony protest, there was a parade. More than 1,000 people attended the book signing and protest.

Filmography

Electoral history

2008 Republican presidential primaries

2016 Democratic presidential primaries

2020 Libertarian presidential primaries

Personal life

Supreme grew up near Boston, Massachusetts, and is said to be the oldest of three children. He graduated from Gloucester High School in 1979, then moved to Baltimore to attend the Maryland Institute College of Art. He eventually dropped out of college and began booking bands for underground music clubs.

He legally changed his name to Vermin Supreme in the 1990s while still in Baltimore.

In 2006, Supreme donated one of his kidneys to his mother, who was suffering from renal failure. He is married and has no children.

See also

 List of frivolous political parties
 Pat Paulsen, often seen Presidential candidate
 Lord Buckethead, a British satirical candidate
 Screaming Lord Sutch, a satirical politician in the United Kingdom
 Count Binface, a British satirical candidate
 Rhinoceros Party, a satirical Canadian political party
 Situationism, an avant-garde social and political art movement which influenced Vermin Supreme

References

External links

 Vermin Supreme 2020, official 2020 presidential campaign website
 Vermin Supreme 2016, official 2016 presidential campaign website
 Vermin Supreme for Overlord of Planet Earth, official Facebook page
 Biography at Project Vote Smart
 
 

1961 births
Living people
21st-century American politicians
American anarchists
American libertarians
American performance artists
American political satire
American satirists
Articles containing video clips
Artists from Baltimore
Candidates in the 2004 United States presidential election
Candidates in the 2008 United States presidential election
Candidates in the 2012 United States presidential election
Candidates in the 2016 United States presidential election
Candidates in the 2020 United States presidential election
Democratic Party (United States) politicians
Left-libertarians
Maryland Libertarians
Massachusetts Libertarians
People from Rockport, Massachusetts
Republican Party (United States) politicians
Social anarchists